Joshua Schache (born 21 August 1997) is a professional Australian rules footballer with the Melbourne Football Club in the Australian Football League (AFL). He previously played for the Brisbane Lions from 2016 to 2017, and the Western Bulldogs from 2018 to 2022.

Early life
Schache started playing Auskick when he was in grade five. He attended high school at Assumption College Kilmore and later Goulburn Valley Grammar School. His late father, Laurence, also played with Brisbane in the early 1990s.

Josh spent his early youth as a ruckman/forward for the Seymour Lions, a club based in the Seymour District Junior Football League. He played with the Murray Bushrangers in the TAC Cup until he was selected to join the Brisbane Lions with the second pick in the 2015 AFL draft.

He won the Larke Medal for his performance in the NAB AFL Under-18 Championships in 2015, where he also he kicked a record 24 goals.

AFL career
During 2017 there was speculation that he would request a trade to a Victorian club, but at the end of the season his manager shut down speculation, insisting that he would not be requesting a trade. Despite this, Brisbane later announced they would be exploring trade options for Schache in the forthcoming trade period. In the final minutes of the trade period, Schache was traded to the Western Bulldogs for pick 25 and 40 despite being contracted until 2019 at the Brisbane Lions.
Schache overcame niggling injuries during the first half of 2018. After strong performances in the VFL he was elevated to the senior side where he finished the season with 17 goals in 13 games.
Schache had a breakout year in 2019, kicking 24 goals from 14 games, only being omitted from the side due to concussion protocols. Schache played in the 2019 Elimination Final against club rivals, Greater Western Sydney. After playing his career best year, Schache only managed to play two senior games in 2020, kicking 2 goals. 

After a one off appearance earlier in 2021, he returned to the senior side in the middle of the season, but as a key defender. This game earned him great praise from the AFL community. Schache managed to play every game for the rest of the year, as a defender too, including the clubs impressive climb to the Grand Final. Schache was moved back to the forward line for the 2021 Final series, kicking 4 goals and shutting down influencing key defenders. He played in the Western Bulldogs 2021 Grand Final team. 

Statistics
Updated to the end of the 2022 season.

|-
| 2016 ||  || 23
| 17 || 16 || 18 || 91 || 56 || 147 || 68 || 26 || 0.9 || 1.1 || 5.4 || 3.3 || 8.6 || 4.0 || 1.5 || 0
|-
| 2017 ||  || 23
| 10 || 9 || 6 || 55 || 36 || 91 || 39 || 10 || 0.9 || 0.6 || 5.5 || 3.6 || 9.1 || 3.9 || 1.0 || 0
|-
| 2018 ||  || 13
| 13 || 17 || 11 || 98 || 61 || 159 || 53 || 14 || 1.3 || 0.9 || 7.5 || 4.7 || 12.2 || 4.1 || 1.1 || 0
|-
| 2019 ||  || 13
| 14 || 24 || 8 || 86 || 55 || 141 || 37 || 25 || 1.7 || 0.6 || 6.1 || 3.9 || 10.1 || 2.6 || 1.8 || 1
|-
| 2020 ||  || 13
| 2 || 2 || 0 || 8 || 5 || 13 || 3 || 0 || 1.0 || 0.0 || 4.0 || 2.5 || 6.5 || 1.5 || 0.0 || 0
|-
| 2021 ||  || 13
| 9 || 5 || 4 || 67 || 27 || 94 || 41 || 11 || 0.6 || 0.4 || 7.4 || 3.0 || 10.4 || 4.6 || 1.2 || 0
|-
| 2022 ||  || 13
| 7 || 5 || 5 || 48 || 14 || 62 || 31 || 14 || 0.7 || 0.7 || 6.9 || 2.0 || 8.9 || 4.4 || 2.0 || 0
|- class=sortbottom
! colspan=3 | Career
! 72 !! 78 !! 52 !! 453 !! 254 !! 707 !! 272 !! 100 !! 1.1 !! 0.7 !! 6.3 !! 3.5 !! 9.8 !! 3.8 !! 1.4 !! 1
|}

Notes

Honours and achievements
Individual
 Larke Medal: 2015

References

External links

1997 births
Living people
Murray Bushrangers players
Australian rules footballers from Victoria (Australia)
Brisbane Lions players
Western Bulldogs players
Australian rules footballers from Adelaide